Miljan Rakić (born May 14, 1986) is a Serbian-Hungarian professional basketball player. Over his career, he has won the Hungarian League championship twice, in 2014 and 2015, and the Adriatic League championship once, in 2005.

Professional career
In June 2013, Rakić signed with Szolnoki Olaj. He started the 2014–15 season with KTE-Duna Aszfalt, but in February 2015, he returned to Szolnoki Olaj for the rest of the season.

On August 23, 2015, he signed with Slovakian team Inter Bratislava.

In January 2020, he signed with Grindavík of the Icelandic Úrvalsdeild karla. He helped Grindavík to the Icelandic Cup Finals in February 2020 where it lost to Stjarnan.

National team
Rakić was member of Serbian junior national teams, with juniors of Serbia he won FIBA Europe Under-20 Championship in 2005.

References

External links
 Miljan Rakić at aba-liga.com
 Miljan Rakić at euroleague.com
 Miljan Rakić at eurobasket.com
 Miljan Rakić at fiba.com

1986 births
Living people
ABA League players
Basketball League of Serbia players
BK Inter Bratislava players
Grindavík men's basketball players
Guards (basketball)
K.A.O.D. B.C. players
KK Hemofarm players
KK Mašinac players
KK Novi Sad players
KK Proleter Zrenjanin players
KK Radnički Kragujevac (2009–2014) players
KK Sloboda Užice players
KK Sveti Đorđe players
Serbian expatriate basketball people in Bosnia and Herzegovina
Serbian expatriate basketball people in Greece
Serbian expatriate basketball people in Hungary
Serbian expatriate basketball people in Iceland
Serbian expatriate basketball people in Portugal
Serbian expatriate basketball people in Slovakia
Serbian men's basketball players
Basketball players from Novi Sad
Szolnoki Olaj KK players
Úrvalsdeild karla (basketball) players